Morningside Road railway station is a former railway station in the Morningside area of Edinburgh, Scotland.  It was opened by the Edinburgh Suburban and Southside Junction Railway (ESSJR) on 1 December 1884 as Morningside Station.

After the ESSJR was incorporated into the North British Railway on 1 March 1885, the station was renamed Morningside Road in October 1886.

Morningside Road station closed in 1962, when passenger rail services were withdrawn from the Edinburgh Suburban line, although the line itself was retained for rail freight use. The route continues to be used for freight services to this day, and occasionally diverted passenger trains also pass through Morningside.  Currently (2022) Avanti West Coast use the line for some empty coaching stock moves between Edinburgh and Glasgow and CrossCountry have a daily passenger train from Glasgow to Edinburgh.

Location

The station was located by Morningside Road, where the road bridge crosses the suburban line, and was accessed via a gate on the west side of the road, opposite the Morningside Clock.

Today the station building has been converted for commercial use. The outer circle platform was removed to allow Mark 3 coaching stock to operate on the line. ScotRail has an advertising hoarding on the bridge next to the clock, where its displays posters advertising passenger rail services. The iron footbridge from the former station still stands to this day, connecting Maxwell Street to Balcarres Street.

Future
A local advocacy group, the Capital Rail Action Group (CRAG), is running a campaign for the SSJR line to be re-opened to passenger services, and proposes that it should be operated either as a commuter rail service or as a light rail system to form an extension of the forthcoming Edinburgh Tram Network. Following a petition submitted to the Scottish Parliament in 2007, the proposal was rejected in 2009 by transport planners due to anticipated cost.

References

External Links

Disused railway stations in Edinburgh
Former North British Railway stations
Railway stations in Great Britain opened in 1884
Railway stations in Great Britain closed in 1962